This is a list of Azerbaijan football transfers in the winter transfer window, 7 January - 3 February 2020, by club. Only clubs of the 2019–20 Azerbaijan Premier League are included.

Azerbaijan Premier League 2019-20

Gabala

In:

Out:

Keşla

In:

Out:

Neftchi Baku

In:

Out:

Qarabağ

In:

Out:

Sabah

In:

 

Out:

Sabail

In:

Out:

Sumgayit

In:

Out:

Zira

In:

Out:

References

Azerbaijan
Azerbaijani football transfer lists
2019–20 in Azerbaijani football